Lecithocera lacunara is a moth in the family Lecithoceridae. It was described by Chun-Sheng Wu and You-Qiao Liu in 1993. It is found in Sichuan, China.

The wingspan is 14–15 mm. The species resembles Lecithocera aulias.

References

Moths described in 1993
lacunara
Moths of Asia